Renato Portella (born 5 December 1962) is a Brazilian sports shooter. He competed in the men's skeet event at the 2016 Summer Olympics.

References

External links
 

1962 births
Living people
Brazilian male sport shooters
Olympic shooters of Brazil
Shooters at the 2016 Summer Olympics
Place of birth missing (living people)